Adelheid (attested from 1211 to 1233) was abbess of the Benedictine monastery of Saint John Abbey, Müstair, now in Switzerland. She is the first abbess of that monastery known by name.

According to 15th century tradition, she belonged to the noble family of von Neiffen. Under her leadership, a blood miracle made the abbey a pilgrimage site, and the  hospice of Santa Maria Val Müstair was constructed.

References

Date of birth unknown
Date of death unknown
13th-century women of the Holy Roman Empire
13th-century Christian nuns